Kinbasket Lake (or Kinbasket Reservoir) is a reservoir on the Columbia River in southeast British Columbia, north of the city of Revelstoke and the town of Golden. The reservoir was created by the construction of the Mica Dam. The lake includes two reaches, Columbia Reach (to the south) and Canoe Reach (to the north), referring to the river valleys flooded by the dam. To the north it almost reaches the town of Valemount in an impoundment of the Canoe River. To the south it reaches upstream the Columbia River towards the city of Golden.

The original, smaller Kinbasket Lake was named in 1866 after Kinbasket, a chief of the Shuswap people. The modern, large lake was created after the completion of the Mica Dam in 1973, and was called McNaughton Lake (after  Andrew McNaughton) until 1980.

A number of small communities were inundated by the creation of Kinbasket Lake, and comprised a region known as the Big Bend Country, a subregion of the Columbia Country.  Among these towns were Mica, Big Bend, Downie, Boat Encampment, La Porte and Beavermouth.

See also
Columbia River Treaty

References

External links

Place name history for Kinbasket Lake

Lakes of British Columbia
Columbia River
Reservoirs in British Columbia
Columbia Country
Kootenay Land District